Osvaldo Lucas Baptista Belo (born 18 October 2000) is an East Timorese footballer who plays as a midfielder for Karketu Dili and the Timor-Leste national football team.

Career

International
Belo made his senior international debut on 3 December 2017 in a 2-1 friendly defeat to Laos.

References

External links

2000 births
Living people
East Timorese footballers
Timor-Leste international footballers
Association football midfielders
People from Dili District